Sir Andries Ferdinand Stockenström Maasdorp (14 January 1847 – 18 March 1931) was chief justice of the Orange River Colony. He was knighted in 1904.

Early life and education
Maasdorp was the second of the five sons of Gysbert Henry Maasdorp and his wife, Anna Maria Hartzenberg. His eldest brother, also Gysbert Henry Maasdorp, was member of the Cape legislative assembly for Graaff-Reinet and the third brother was Justice Christian Maasdorp. Maasdorp was educated at the grammar school at Graaff Reinet. In 1865, he was awarded a gold medal by the Cape board of examiners, for coming first in mathematics and classics in their examination. He subsequently studied at Graaff- Reinet College and at University College London, where he obtained a BA in 1869.

Career
In 1871 he was admitted to the Inner Temple as barrister, and from March 1872 practised at the Cape bar. In 1890 he became Queen's Counsel. In the late 1890s he moved to Pretoria and practised at the Pretoria bar from 1897 until 1899. When a dispute arose between President Paul Kruger and Chief Justice John Gilbert Kotzé, Maasdorp sided with Kotzé. With the outbreak of the Second Anglo-Boer War, he returned to the Cape Colony and once again practised at Grahamstown.

In 1902 he became Chief Justice of the Orange River Colony and after South Africa became a Union, he became the Judge President of the Orange Free State Provincial Division of the Supreme Court of South Africa. He was knighted in 1904 and retired from the bench at the end of 1919.

Personal life
Maasdorp married Agnes Catherine Thomson Hayton in 1880 and they had three sons and two daughters.

References

External links
https://www.1820settlers.com/genealogy/getperson.php?personID=I17554&tree=master

1847 births
1931 deaths
Knights Bachelor
South African judges
19th-century South African judges
20th-century South African judges
Members of the Inner Temple
South African Queen's Counsel
South African knights